Robert Michael Schneider (born October 31, 1963) is an American actor, stand-up comedian, screenwriter, producer, and director. After several years performing stand-up comedy, Schneider found wider success during his tenure as a cast member and writer for the NBC sketch comedy series Saturday Night Live from 1988 to 1994. Following his departure from SNL, he went on to a career in feature films, including starring roles in the comedy films Deuce Bigalow: Male Gigolo (1999) and its 2005 sequel, The Animal (2001), The Hot Chick (2002), The Benchwarmers (2006), and Big Stan (2007). Schneider is the father of singer Elle King.

Early life 
Schneider was born in San Francisco, California on Halloween Day in 1963, and grew up in the nearby suburb of Pacifica. His parents were Pilar (née Monroe), a former kindergarten teacher and ex-school board president, and Marvin Schneider, a real estate broker. His father was Jewish and his mother was Catholic. Schneider's maternal grandmother was a Filipina who met and married his grandfather, a white American army private, while he was stationed in the Philippines. His mixed background is a common theme in his comedy acts. His older brother, John, is a producer. Schneider graduated from Terra Nova High School in 1982 and then attended San Francisco State University.

Career

Early career 

Schneider started doing stand-up comedy while still in high school, opening for San Francisco favorites Head On, a band managed by his older brother John. After high school, he played Bay Area nightclubs such as the Holy City Zoo and The Other Café, and was a regular guest on local radio programs. After opening a show by comedian Dennis Miller in 1987, Schneider won a slot on HBO's 13th Annual Young Comedians special, which was hosted by Miller. Schneider's appearance on the HBO special led to a position as a writer for the late night NBC sketch comedy series Saturday Night Live.

Saturday Night Live 
Schneider was hired at Saturday Night Live in 1988. Schneider swiftly graduated from writer and featured player to full cast member. From 1990 to 1994 at SNL, he played such roles as "Tiny Elvis" and "Orgasm Guy". His best known recurring character was Richard Laymer, an office worker whose desk was stuck beside the photocopier, and who addressed each of his fellow employees with an endless stream of annoying nicknames. Schneider is featured in the video release The Bad Boys of Saturday Night Live, along with colleagues Adam Sandler, Chris Rock, David Spade, and Chris Farley.

Recurring SNL characters 
 The Richmeister, an office worker who annoys people by giving them nicknames as they make copies.
 Carlo, from the Il Cantore Restaurant sketches
 The Sensitive Naked Man, a nude man who gives advice to other characters

Feature films, sitcoms, and endorsements 

After leaving SNL, Schneider played supporting roles in a series of movies including Surf Ninjas, Judge Dredd, The Beverly Hillbillies, Home Alone 2: Lost in New York, Demolition Man, and Down Periscope. He also appeared in a recurring part on the television series Coach. In 1996, he co-starred in the NBC sitcom Men Behaving Badly, an American take on the hit British series of the same name. The U.S. version ran for two seasons.

Schneider starred in the 1999 feature film Deuce Bigalow: Male Gigolo, a tale of a fish-tank cleaner who incurs a massive debt and is forced to become a "man-whore." This was followed by The Animal, about a man given animal powers by a mad scientist; The Hot Chick, wherein the body of a petty thief named Clive Maxtone (played by Schneider) is mystically switched with the body of a pretty, but mean-spirited high school cheerleader named Jessica Spencer (played by Rachel McAdams in her film debut); and the sequel Deuce Bigalow: European Gigolo. The latter movie was not well received by critics or moviegoers, and as a result, Schneider won a 2005 Worst Actor Razzie Award for his role in the film.

In 2006, Schneider co-starred in the baseball-themed family comedy The Benchwarmers, along with his fellow SNL alumnus David Spade as well as Jon Heder. Other film roles include Schneider's appearance with Jim Henson's Muppets in the 1999 film Muppets from Space, and his role as a San Francisco hobo in the 2004 remake of Around the World in 80 Days.

Schneider's directorial debut, the comedy Big Stan, was released in some overseas markets during the fall of 2008, with a U.S. release in early 2009. In the film, he starred as a real estate con artist who is arrested for perpetrating real-estate scams. He is sentenced to prison, so he takes a crash-course in martial arts to survive incarceration.

Schneider has also appeared in numerous comedies starring his SNL comrade Adam Sandler, including 1998's The Waterboy, 2010's Grown Ups, and 2020's Hubie Halloween. The comedic characters Schneider plays in these films include an overly enthusiastic Cajun man who proclaims the catch-phrase, "You can do it!"; an amiable Middle Eastern delivery boy; a prison inmate; and Sandler's one-eyed Hawaiian sidekick, Ula. Schneider has uttered the line "You can do it!" as a running gag in Sandler's films The Waterboy, Little Nicky, 50 First Dates, The Longest Yard, and Bedtime Stories, as well as in a deleted scene from Click (a sample of Schneider saying the phrase also turns up in the song "Original Prankster" by The Offspring). Returning the favor, Sandler appeared in a cameo to spout the same line in Schneider's The Animal. Schneider narrated Sandler's 2002 animated movie Eight Crazy Nights, and voiced the part of a Chinese waiter. Schneider also had an uncredited cameo as a Canadian-Japanese wedding-chapel minister in the 2007 Sandler-Kevin James comedy I Now Pronounce You Chuck & Larry, and played a Palestinian cab driver who serves as the title character's nemesis in the 2008 Sandler film You Don't Mess with the Zohan.

Schneider played a variety of roles in the 2005 television special Back to Norm, starring another former SNL player Norm Macdonald, and appeared on episodes of the popular television shows Seinfeld and Ally McBeal. Schneider hosted the Sports Illustrated: Swimsuit '97 TV special, and the 2005 Teen Choice Awards, and was a frequent guest on NBC's late-night variety program The Tonight Show with Jay Leno. In Schneider's appearance with Leno on the July 24, 2007 episode of The Tonight Show, he showed up in drag as actress Lindsay Lohan after the latter cancelled following a controversial arrest for driving under the influence.

Besides his efforts in movies and television, Schneider released his first comedy album Registered Offender in July 2010. Registered Offender is composed of audio sketches and songs, with Schneider himself doing all of the character voices on the recording. He also revived his stand-up comedy career in 2010 with an international tour of theaters, clubs, and casinos.

Schneider appeared in the music video for country singer Neal McCoy's "Billy's Got His Beer Goggles On", as the song's title character. McCoy and Schneider met while the two went on a USO tour in support of U.S. troops two months after the September 11, 2001 terrorist attacks on the World Trade Center and the Pentagon.

Schneider starred as the title character in the CBS sitcom Rob, which was loosely based on his real life. The series was canceled by CBS in May 2012.  In 2015, he produced, directed and starred in Real Rob, a sitcom that follows his life and includes his real-life wife Patricia and daughter Miranda. Netflix released a season of 8 episodes, and a second season in 2017.

Schneider is the official celebrity spokesperson for the Taiwan Tourism Bureau and the Ten Ren Tea company in Taipei.

Schneider was spokesperson for State Farm Insurance, but was dropped in 2014 due to his anti-vaccination views.

In May 2016, Schneider was featured as a special guest on the Let's Play webseries Game Grumps, alongside his wife Patricia, commentating over Midway's Mortal Kombat Trilogy. They reappeared on the show in November 2017, then commentating over Konami's Contra.

In 2021, Schneider competed on season six of The Masked Singer as the wild card contestant "Hamster". A running gag is that "Hamster" would pantomime urinating on Nick Cannon and get affectionate with him. When unmasked on the fifth week, Schneider dedicated his performance of Luis Miguel's Sabor a Mí to Patricia and his daughters Miranda, Madeline, and Elle. In addition, Schneider did a variation of his Townie character's "You can do it" line by quoting Hamster's final words "You can do it Masked Singer, all night long!"

In 2022, he starred, produced, and directed in Daddy Daughter Trip, which served as his third film as a director and also starred his wife Patricia and daughter Miranda. The film will be exclusively shown in Harkins Theaters.

Personal life 
Schneider has a daughter with former model London King, musician Elle King, who was born in 1989.

In 1996, Schneider established the Rob Schneider Music Foundation. The foundation returned music education to Pacifica's elementary schools by paying the teachers' salaries and providing funds for instruments and other equipment. Prior to Schneider's efforts, the school system did not have music education programs for many years.

Schneider once co-owned the DNA Lounge, a San Francisco nightclub.

On April 23, 2011, Schneider married television producer Patricia Azarcoya Arce, in Beverly Hills, California. Their first child, Miranda Scarlett Schneider, was born in 2012. The couple had their second daughter, Madeline Robbie Schneider, in September 2016. The family supports Mexican soccer club Tigres, which is based in Patricia's hometown of Monterrey.

In December 2020, Schneider and his family moved to Arizona.

Political views and positions
In 2013, Schneider switched political parties from the Democratic Party to the Republican Party, explaining: "The state of California is a mess, and the super majority of Democrats is not working. I've been a lifelong Democrat and I have to switch over because it no longer serves the people of this great state." 

That same year, Schneider endorsed Republican Assemblyman Tim Donnelly for governor in the election the following year.

In an interview on Larry King Now in 2017, Schneider said he was an independent but leaned more conservative.

Anti-vaccination activism
Schneider has been an outspoken critic of childhood vaccinations. In an interview with News10 in Sacramento, Schneider opined that "The efficacy of these shots have not been proven ... And the toxicity of these things – we're having more and more side effects. We're having more and more autism." Schneider's statements have been discredited as lacking any factual basis. He also views the actions from the state to mandate vaccinations as government overreach. 

Schneider has actively opposed the passage of two California laws, California Assembly Bill 2109 and California Senate Bill 277, which both intended to make childhood vaccination exemptions harder to obtain. On September 28, 2012, Schneider and California State Assemblyman Tim Donnelly spoke at the "Medical Freedom Rally", where they urged California Governor Jerry Brown to veto Assembly Bill 2109, which would have made it more difficult for parents to utilize philosophical reasons for exemptions from mandatory childhood vaccinations. While the bill was not vetoed, Governor Brown added a signing message instructing the Department of Health to add a religious exemption and to make sure the process is not overly burdensome to parents. 

In 2015, Schneider fought against California Senate Bill 277, which removed exemptions to mandatory vaccinations due to personal beliefs, even leaving a phone message to California state Assemblywoman and bill co-author Lorena Gonzalez saying that he would spend money against her in her next re-election. Gonzalez, in an interview with The Washington Times, said that she found the message to be disturbing, but upon calling back, she said, "he was actually much nicer to me, but let's be honest … that is 20 mins of my life I'll never get back arguing that vaccines don't cause autism with Deuce Bigalow: Male Gigolo. #vaccinateyourkids."

Filmography

Film

Television

Video games

References

External links 

 
 

1963 births
20th-century American male actors
21st-century American male actors
American male actors of Filipino descent
American male comedians
American male film actors
American anti-vaccination activists
American male screenwriters
American male television actors
American people of Jewish descent
Comedy film directors
People from Pacifica, California
Male actors from San Francisco
Living people
American sketch comedians
American male comedy actors
Autism pseudoscience
Comedians from California
Writers from San Francisco
San Francisco State University alumni
20th-century American comedians
21st-century American comedians
Screenwriters from California
American comedians of Asian descent